The Parish of St. Christopher and St. Sylvia is a parish under the authority of the Roman Catholic Archdiocese of New York, located in Red Hook, Dutchess County, New York. In November 2014, the Archdiocese of New York announced that the parish of  St. Sylvia's Church in Tivoli, New York would merge with St. Christopher's. Although it would remain a church which may be used on special occasions, Masses and the sacraments will no longer be celebrated on a regular weekly basis at St. Sylvia's as of August 2015.

St. Christopher, Red Hook
St. Christopher's Church was founded as a mission of Sacred Heart Parish in Barrytown in 1910, and elevated to parish status in 1975. Sacred Heart parish was established in 1875 in Barrytown to serve immigrants settling in the area. As the area developed and the population grew, the little church could not hold all the Catholics who wanted to come to Mass. Hazardous travel conditions again played a role: Improved transportation had led to settlement farther inland, and the trip to Barrytown was difficult and even dangerous in winter. For a while the parish used a local theater for Sunday Mass. In 1925 it purchased property and laid the cornerstone for St. Christopher's Church, which was dedicated in 1926. When plans were under way to build St. Christopher's Church in Red Hook 75 years ago, parishioners hauled stones from their own yards and fields for its exterior walls.

The parish school, staffed by Sparkill Dominican Sisters, opened in 1962, but low enrollment caused it to close in 1985; the school building, now the parish center, houses the religious education program. Holy Spirit Chapel is in the parish center. Its stained-glass windows depict the evangelists, St. John Bosco, St. Maria Goretti, and four Americans: SS. Frances Xavier Cabrini, Elizabeth Ann Seton and John Neumann and Blessed Kateri Tekakwitha. Special Masses, confirmation retreats and other events take place there.

Pastors
Pastors who served St. Christopher's in Red Hook and the parish from which it developed, Sacred Heart in Barrytown, are:
Rev. James Fitzsimmons, 1875-1885
Rev. William J. McClure, 1886-1893
Rev. Daniel J. Cronin, 1893-1899
Rev. Hugh P. Cullum, 1899-1901
Rev. Matthew J.F. Scanlon, 1901-1919
Rev. Joseph B. Cherry, 1919-1922
Rev. P. McAleer, 1922-1923
Rev. Cornelius Fitzsimmons, 1924-1932
Rev. John Kenny, 1932-1937
Rev. Louis A. Jaudas, 1937-1940
Rev. John A. Walsh, 1941
Rev. Msgr. John R. Carroll, 1941-1969
Rev. Hugh Devers, 1969-1974
Rev. Theodore J. Schulz, 1974-1980
Rev. Louis J. Mazza, 1980-1986
 Rev. Msgr. Charles P. Coen (1986- Pastor Emeritus)
 Rev. Patrick F. Buckley (2011-2021)
 Rev. Douglas Y. Crawford (2021-  )

Merger
In November 2014, the Archdiocese of New York announced that St. Sylvia's Church in Tivoli, New York would merge with St. Christopher's. Although remaining a church which may be used on special occasions, Masses and the sacraments will no longer be celebrated on a regular weekly basis at St. Sylvia's as of August 2015.

St. Sylvia, Tivoli

The Church of St. Sylvia is a Roman Catholic parish church under the authority of the Roman Catholic Archdiocese of New York, located in Tivoli, Dutchess County, New York. The parish was established in 1890.

History
Tivoli's first Catholics were Irish and German, and arrived in 1852. Mass was said in their homes by Rev. Michael C. Powers of Saugerties, until the first church, a small wooden building, was constructed. After Father Powers, Fathers Michael Scully 
and Fitzsimmons of Rhinebeck tended the mission. In 1886, Tivoli became a mission of Barrytown, and in 1890 was made a parish. Since February 2009, St. Sylvia's has celebrated Mass in both authorized forms of the Roman Rite, the ordinary and the extraordinary.

Pastors
 Rev. James Fenton, 1890
 Rev. Michael Reinhardt
 Rev. P.F. Maughan
 Rev. Lenes
 Rev. J.H. Dooley
 Rev. Charles Joseph Parks
 Rev. Geissler
 Rev. Alfred Croke

The old church was replaced by a new memorial church and rectory in 1902 as a gift from Countess Carola de Laugier-Villars and her sister, Mrs. Geraldyn Redmond, in memory of their mother. The new stone church was consecrated on June 28, 1903, by Cardinal Farley.

The parish school, also a memorial gift,  was established in 1888. At one time St. Sylvia's sponsored a cottage lace industry.

In 2015, the parish of St. Sylvia in Tivoli was merged with St. Christopher's Church in Red Hook.

References

External links

 Parish of St. Christopher and St. Sylvia

Christian organizations established in 1910
Roman Catholic churches in New York (state)
Churches in Dutchess County, New York
Red Hook, New York
U.S. Route 9
Roman Catholic parishes in the United States